Doteraman is an anime television series created by Tatsunoko Productions.

Plot
Suzuki is a middle-aged entrepreneur who lives in a small town near Tokyo and owns a small business. Despite his hopelessly normal life, he dreams of becoming a celebrity and generally popular. One day he happens to discover the entrance to an unknown space. By traveling through it, he reaches a world of goblins and uses a device to make them obey his commands. He uses his newfound minions for his greedy desires and sets his hand to evil things. Meanwhile, Hajime and his girlfriend Mariko come across a strange alien detective who which allows them to don the appearance of a goblin. Dressed like the goblins, they transform into Doteraman and Doterapink respectively. With Doteraman's supernatural strength, they challenge the Suzuki and successfully liberate the manipulated goblins.

Cast
 Noriko Tsukase as Satou Hajime
 Chie Koujiro as Nakamura Mariko
 Yuriko Fuchizaki as Onizou
 Kazuomi Ikeda as Zukan Sokunets
 Jouji Yanami as Suzuki Shigeru / Inchiki-daiou
 Naoko Matsui as Suzuki Manami / Shishunki
 Kenichi Ono as Genki
 Nozomu Sasaki as Tanki
 Ikuo Nishikawa as Inki and Bunta

References

External links
 

1986 anime television series debuts
Nippon TV original programming
Tatsunoko Production
1987 Japanese television series endings